Gymnastics competitions at the 2017 Islamic Solidarity Games in Baku were held from 12 to 15 May. The competition was split into two disciplines, artistic and rhythmic. Women competed in both disciplines whereas the men only took part in the artistic competition.

Medalists

Men's artistic

Women's artistic

Rhythmic

Medal table

References

2017 Islamic Solidarity Games
Islamic Solidarity Games
Gymnastics at the Islamic Solidarity Games
International gymnastics competitions hosted by Azerbaijan